Wendy K. Adams is an American physics educator. She is known for her work on interactive educational simulations of physics including the PhET Interactive Simulations project, on the effectiveness of peer discussions on conceptual understanding of physics, on measurement of student beliefs about physical concepts, on public beliefs about what it is like to be a physics teacher, and on other aspects of physics education. She is a research associate professor of physics in the Colorado School of Mines.

Education and career
Adams is originally from Colorado, and graduated from the University of Northern Colorado in 1994 with a bachelor's degree in physics. She earned a master's degree from the University of Colorado in 1996, and returned to the University of Colorado for a Ph.D., which she completed in 2008 under the supervision of Carl Wieman. She became a faculty member at the Colorado School of Mines in 2017.

Recognition
Adams was the 2018 winner of the Excellence in Physics Education Award of the American Physical Society (APS). The award cited her "systematic development, dissemination, and evaluation of the physics education tool, PhET Interactive Simulations project, used world-wide by millions of students and their teachers". In 2019 she was named a Fellow of the American Physical Society, after a nomination by the APS Forum on Education, "for impactful physics education research and the subsequent development of assessments in the areas of problem solving, student beliefs, and teacher preparation, leading to a range of improvements such as increased student learning and reductions in physics teacher shortages".

References

External links

Year of birth missing (living people)
Living people
21st-century American physicists
American women physicists
University of Northern Colorado alumni
University of Colorado alumni
Colorado School of Mines faculty
Fellows of the American Physical Society
American women academics
21st-century American women scientists
Scientists from Colorado